Toshima Karki is a Nepali politician, a doctor by profession and member of Rastriya Swatantra Party. Dr. Karki is a former Minister of State for Health Ministry of Nepal. 
 
She was elected to the House of Representatives in 2022 from Lalitpur 3.

Early life and education
Toshima Karki was born in Nawalparasi district to Padam Karki and Deepa Karki. Her family later moved to Adinath Village of Lalitpur district, wherein she completed her high school education from Shaheed Dharmabhakta School, Nakhkhu (Classes 1-10) and Modern Indian School, Chobhar (Classes 11-12). She then pursued an MBBS degree from KIST College, Patan and further received her specialization in General Surgery with a Master of Surgery degree from Kathmandu University School of Medical Sciences.
Dr. Karki has remained an activist since her undergraduate days. She led the protest of intern doctors and medical students against wrongdoings in medical colleges in 2014-15.

Professional and political career 
Dr. Karki is a general surgeon by education and practice. Alongside her medical profession, she has been actively vocal on the issues of health worker rights, physical attacks on medical professionals, and other pertinent malpractices in the Nepalese medical field. She transitioned from a social activist to a politician after having joined the Rastriya Swatantra Party, ahead of the 2022 Nepalese general election.

She served as a lecturer in surgery at the Patan Academy of Health Sciences before filing her candidacy for the House of Representatives from Lalitpur 3. She was also an elected member of the executive committee at Nepal Medical Council until she resigned from the post on December 4, 2022, following her electoral win. Her candidacy was initially rejected by the Election Commission of Nepal, citing her NMC member post as a position of profit. She filed a writ petition at the Supreme Court which upheld her candidacy.

Electoral history 
In the 2022 Nepalese general election, she was elected from the Lalitpur 3 constituency, securing 31,136 (53.55%) votes, also beating the then Energy Minister, Pampha Bhusal.

See also 
Rastriya Swatantra Party

References 

Nepal MPs 2022–present
Rastriya Swatantra Party politicians
Nepalese surgeons
Living people
1990 births
State ministers of Nepal